|}

The Cumberland Lodge Stakes is a Group 3 flat horse race in Great Britain open to horses aged three years or older. It is run at Ascot over a distance of 1 mile 3 furlongs and 211 yards (2,406 metres), and it is scheduled to take place each year in early October.

History
The event is named after Cumberland Lodge, the location of a successful 18th-century stud. It was the birthplace of the racehorses Herod and Eclipse.

The Cumberland Lodge Stakes was established in 1951, and it was initially contested over two miles. It was shortened by half a mile in 1952.

The race was titled the John Collier Stakes in 1965, and the David Robinson Stakes in 1967. The present system of race grading was introduced in 1971, and the event was classed at Group 3 level.

The Cumberland Lodge Stakes was formerly held in September, but it was switched to early October in 2011.

Records
Most successful horse (2 wins):
 Knockroe – 1971, 1972
 High Accolade – 2003, 2004

Leading jockey (7 wins):
 Lester Piggott – Park Top (1970), Knockroe (1971, 1972), Scottish Rifle (1973), Calaba (1975), Bruni (1976), Critique (1981)
 Pat Eddery – Orange Bay (1977), Fordham (1978), Fingal's Cave (1980), Lafontaine (1982), Moon Madness (1987), Assatis (1988), Tralos (1989)

Leading trainer (6 wins):
 Marcus Tregoning – Nayef (2001), High Accolade (2003, 2004), Mubtaker (2005), Mawatheeq (2009), Hawaafez (2012)

Winners since 1975

Earlier winners

 1951: Talma
 1952: Rawson
 1953: Aureole
 1954: Elopement
 1955: Daemon
 1956: Le Pretendant
 1957: Doutelle
 1958: Mon Fetiche
 1959: Aggressor
 1960: High Perch
 1961: Hot Brandy
 1962: Silver Cloud
 1963: Wily Trout
 1964: King Chestnut
 1965: Super Sam
 1966: no race
 1967: Sucaryl
 1968: Chicago
 1969: Remand
 1970: Park Top
 1971: Knockroe
 1972: Knockroe
 1973: Scottish Rifle
 1974: Shebeen

See also
 Horse racing in Great Britain
 List of British flat horse races

References
 Paris-Turf: 
 Racing Post:

 galopp-sieger.de – Cumberland Lodge Stakes.
 horseracingintfed.com – International Federation of Horseracing Authorities – Cumberland Lodge Stakes (2018).
 pedigreequery.com – Cumberland Lodge Stakes – Ascot.
 

Flat races in Great Britain
Ascot Racecourse
Open middle distance horse races
Recurring sporting events established in 1951